Matej Sivrić (born 27 November 1989)  is a Croatian football forward, who plays for NK Marsonia 1909 in Croatia.

References

External links
 Profile on fotbal.idnes.cz 
 

1989 births
Living people
Sportspeople from Slavonski Brod
Association football forwards
Croatian footballers
NK Marsonia players
NK Maksimir players
FC Slovan Liberec players
FK Viktoria Žižkov players
FK Mladá Boleslav players
FC Baník Ostrava players
MFK Karviná players
HŠK Zrinjski Mostar players
NK Široki Brijeg players
Czech First League players
Czech National Football League players
Premier League of Bosnia and Herzegovina players
Croatian expatriate footballers
Expatriate footballers in the Czech Republic
Croatian expatriate sportspeople in the Czech Republic
Expatriate footballers in Bosnia and Herzegovina
Croatian expatriate sportspeople in Bosnia and Herzegovina